Israel Goldstein Youth Village, known in Hebrew as the Havat HaNoar HaTzioni, is a youth village and high school in Jerusalem, Israel.

History

Havat HaNoar HaTzioni was established in 1949 as a home for 40 Jewish orphans who lost their families in the Holocaust. It was named for Israel Goldstein, a prominent rabbi and Zionist leader. Today the school has over 500 students, many of them new immigrants.

In the summers, Havat HaNoar HaTzioni is one of the home bases of the Ramah Israel Seminar, a program affiliated with Camp Ramah, a network of Jewish summer camps in North America.

Programs
Jerusalem American International School is located in the youth village.

The Lycée Havat-Hanoar-Hatsioni, a French international school, is affiliated with the youth village. Its terminale (final year of senior high school) classes were created in 1967/1968 by two groups: Nathanya by Léon Ashkénazi and Alyat Hanoar in Nazareth. These groups merged during the 1975–1976 school year. This school integrated with the youth village since 1991. It includes boarding facilities.

Tichon Ramah Yerushalayim (TRY), Ramah Israel's semester abroad high school program, is located on the North end of the campus, along with the Ramah Israel offices.

See also
 Aliyah
 Zionism
 Youth village

References

External links
 Lycée Havat-Hanoar-Hatsioni 
 Lycée Havat Hanoar Hatsioni - Embassy of France in Israel 
 JERUSALEM Lycée Havat Hanoar Hatsioni - AEFE Europe

Boarding schools in Israel
High schools in Israel
Youth villages in Israel
Schools in Jerusalem
1949 establishments in Israel
Katamon